Douglas Edward Lee (born October 24, 1964) is a retired American professional basketball player.

A 6'5" (1.96 m) guard-forward from Texas A&M University and Purdue University, in the 1987 NCAA Division I men's basketball tournament Lee as team captain led No. 3 seeded 1986–87 Purdue Boilermakers men's basketball team to the round of 32, with his team defeating the Northeastern Huskies in the opening round by 104–95. He was selected by the Houston Rockets in the 2nd round (35th overall) of the 1987 NBA Draft, going on to play in three National Basketball Association (NBA) seasons for New Jersey Nets (1991–93) and Sacramento Kings (1994–95).

In his NBA career, Lee played in 73 games, played 415 minutes, and scored a total of 168 points.

References

External links
NBA stats at www.databasebasketball.com
Peoria Sports Hall of Fame Inductee profile

1964 births
Living people
Albany Patroons players
American expatriate basketball people in Croatia
American expatriate basketball people in Israel
American expatriate basketball people in Italy
American men's basketball players
Basketball players from Illinois
Basket Rimini Crabs players
Grand Rapids Hoops players
Hapoel Tel Aviv B.C. players
Houston Rockets draft picks
Israeli Basketball Premier League players
KK Cibona players
La Crosse Bobcats players
Las Vegas Silver Bandits players
New Jersey Nets players
People from Washington, Illinois
Purdue Boilermakers men's basketball players
Rockford Lightning players
Sacramento Kings players
Shooting guards
Small forwards
Texas A&M Aggies men's basketball players